Eduard 'Edu' Caballer Bel (born 2 October 1981 in Vinaròs, Castellón) is a Spanish retired footballer who played as a central defender.

External links
 
 Futbolme profile 

1981 births
Living people
People from Baix Maestrat
Sportspeople from the Province of Castellón
Spanish footballers
Footballers from the Valencian Community
Association football defenders
Segunda División players
Villarreal CF B players